The tournament in Nanchang was a new addition to the WTA 125K series.

Peng Shuai won the tournament, defeating Liu Fangzhou in the final, 6–2, 3–6, 6–3.

Seeds

Main draw

Finals

Top half

Bottom half

References 
 Main draw
 Qualifying draw

Jiangxi International Women's Tennis Open - Singles
Jiangxi International Women's Tennis Open